The 1995 Florida A&M Rattlers football team represented Florida A&M University as a member of the Mid-Eastern Athletic Conference (MEAC) during the 1995 NCAA Division I-AA football season. The Rattlers were led by second-year head coach Billy Joe and played their home games at Bragg Memorial Stadium in Tallahassee, Florida. They finished the season with an overall record of 9–3 and a mark of 6–0 in conference play, winning the MEAC title.

Schedule

References

Florida AandM
Florida A&M Rattlers football seasons
Mid-Eastern Athletic Conference football champion seasons
Florida AandM Rattlers football